Gendishmin (also Romanized as Gendīshmīn) is a village in Dujaq Rural District of Samarin District of Ardabil County, Ardabil province, Iran. At the 2006 census, its population was 1,034 in 206 households. The following census in 2011 counted 856 people in 221 households. The latest census in 2016 showed a population of 763 people in 240 households; it is the largest village in its rural district.

References 

Ardabil County

Towns and villages in Ardabil County

Populated places in Ardabil Province

Populated places in Ardabil County